Rangakarmee – A Tradition, A Culture, A Movement is a noted Indian theatre group, based in Kolkata.  The theatre group was founded in January, 1976 by Usha Ganguly. They spearhead Hindi theatre in Kolkata, they have also staged Bengali plays. Rangakarmee, believes in Theatre with a Mission. Its primary aim is to create awareness about the rampant insensitivity and practice of injustice to which women and other weak sections of society often fall victim. To carry its message to the audience Rangakarmee, under the able guidance of Usha Ganguli, created a language of its own – a style of communication solely dependent on theatre, which can cross the barrier of languages spoken by different communities within India and abroad.

Presently Smt Tripty Mitra is the Creative Director , Hirakendu Ganguli is the President and Anirudh Sarkar is the Secretary.

Productions
 Mahabhoj (The Great Feast) (1984)
 Lok Katha (Folk Tale) (1987)
 Holi (1989)
Vama (1990)
 Court Martial (1991)
 Rudali (The Mourner) (1992)
Khoj (1994)
Beti Aayee (1996)
Maiyyat (1997)
 Himmat Mai (Mother Courage) (1998)
Shyama’r Udal
 Shobhayatra (2000)
 Kashinama (2003)
 Chandalika
 Sarhad Par Manto
 Manasi (in Bengali) (2011) 
Saptaparnee
Meghdutam
Atmaj

Controversies

According to a news article published in The Statesman on 19 August 2010, the members of the Rangakarmee theatre group complained that director and founder member Usha Ganguly was harassing them to transfer the group's property in her own name.

References

External links

Theatre companies in India
Culture of Kolkata
Hindi theatre
Organizations established in 1976
Bengali theatre groups